Zenarchopterus is a genus of viviparous halfbeaks. These fish are found in marine, brackish and fresh water of the Indo-Pacific region. Despite being in the viviparous halfbeak family, Zenarchopterus species are oviparous.

They are commonly known as river garfish.

Species
There are currently 19 recognized species in this genus:
 Zenarchopterus alleni Collette, 1982 (Allen's river garfish)
 Zenarchopterus buffonis (Valenciennes, 1847) (Buffon's river garfish)
 Zenarchopterus caudovittatus (M. C. W. Weber, 1907) (Long-jawed river garfish)
 Zenarchopterus clarus Mohr, 1926
 Zenarchopterus dispar (Valenciennes, 1847) (Feathered river garfish)
 Zenarchopterus dunckeri Mohr, 1926 (Duncker's river garfish)
 Zenarchopterus dux Seale, 1910
 Zenarchopterus ectuntio (F. Hamilton, 1822)
 Zenarchopterus gilli H. M. Smith, 1945 
 Zenarchopterus kampeni (M. C. W. Weber, 1913) (Sepik River halfbeak)
 Zenarchopterus novaeguineae (M. C. W. Weber, 1913) (Fly River garfish)
 Zenarchopterus ornithocephala Collette, 1985 (Vogelkop river garfish)
 Zenarchopterus pappenheimi Mohr, 1926 (Bangkok halfbeak)
 Zenarchopterus philippinus (W. K. H. Peters, 1868)
 Zenarchopterus quadrimaculatus Mohr, 1926
 Zenarchopterus rasori (Popta, 1912) (Short river garfish)
 Zenarchopterus robertsi Collette, 1982 (Robert's river garfish)
 Zenarchopterus striga (Blyth, 1858) (Hooghly halfbeak)
 Zenarchopterus xiphophorus Mohr, 1934

References 

 
Zenarchopteridae
Taxonomy articles created by Polbot